Juliette Pary (August 6, 1903–October 1, 1950) was Jewish-French Russian born journalist, writer, translator and educator activist.

Biography
Born as Julia Gourfinkel in Odesa. She grew up in an Haskalah family, who was involved in the Jewish society. She learned languages and literature. Following the Russian Revolution  her family deteriorated financially. She moved to Paris following her sister, the writer Nina Gourfinkel.  In Paris she replaced her surname to Pary, as an homage to the city. She began working as a translator, translated detective novels by Agatha Christie. During the years 1928-1930 she wrote in the  nascent newspaper Embassies and Consulates (Ambassades et Consulats) about French diplomacy. 

She translated German novels by Stefan Zweig and Hermann Hesse.  

In 1931 Pary married Isaac Pougatch, a Ukrainian refugee, who worked in an art gallery. Following Nazi Germany consolidates, she and her husband helped German Jewish refugees, and worked with Zionist youth organization Agriculture and Crafts (Agriculture et artisanat) and wrote in the weekly Jewish Journal (Journal Juif). Between the years 1933-1935 she published three novels.

In the 1930s Pary wrote for the different magazines, among them Marianne and Regards,   and was involved with the French Left  Popular Front. In 1938 she was the Jewish delegate for the international women's conference on peace and democracy, and wrote about it for the newspaper.
For three months she managed a Jewish children summer camp. She depict this period in 
her book My 126 children (Mes 126 gosses) 

which was adapted to a movie. 

Along with her husband she translated Anton Makarenko from Russian and Sholem Asch from Yiddish.

In 1940 Pary and her husband run away from the German to Moissac, where they managed a Zionism youth camp. 
In 1942 they escaped to Switzerland, there she helped to save Jewish orphans. 

By 1944 she returned to France and become a  liaison officer for the Ministry of Prisoners, Deportees, and Refugees. In 1946 she published poems In German. In 1948 she published her experiences in the summer camps between the war in the book Law and freedom (Droit et liberté). In 1949 she got divorced. 

After the founding of Israel State,  Pary went to the Negev, and was the first European journalist who reviewed the South front in the 1948 Arab–Israeli War, her impressions published in the book Images from the young Israel (Images du jeune Israël)

References

French crime fiction writers
French children's writers
English–French translators
German–French translators
People from Odesa
People from Vevey
Jewish writers from the Russian Empire
Jewish French writers
1903 births
1950 deaths

fr:Juliette Pary